Mirificarma ocellinella is a moth of the family Gelechiidae. It is found in Morocco, Algeria, Tunisia, Libya and Jordan.

The wingspan is 9–11 mm for males and 8.5-10.5 mm for females. The head is cream to light brown. The forewings are cream to light brown, sometimes mottled with darker brown. Adults are on wing in January, from March to May and from September to November.

The larvae feed on Retama raetam. They hide in a long silk tube at the base of the host plant during the day and come out to feed on the leafy branches at night. Larvae are full grown at the beginning of March.

References

Moths described in 1915
Mirificarma
Moths of Asia
Moths of Africa